Oktōēchos (here transcribed ""; Greek:  pronounced in koine: ; from ὀκτώ "eight" and ἦχος "sound, mode" called echos; Slavonic: Осмогласие, Osmoglasie from о́смь "eight" and гласъ "voice, sound") is the name of the eight mode system used for the composition of religious chant in most Christian churches during the Middle Ages. In a modified form the octoechos is still regarded as the foundation of the tradition of monodic Orthodox chant today (Neobyzantine Octoechos).

The Octoechos as a liturgical concept which established an organization of the calendar into eight-week cycles, was the invention of monastic hymnographers at Mar Saba in Palestine and in Constantinople. It was formally accepted in the Quinisext Council of 692, which also aimed to replace the exegetic poetry of the kontakion and other homiletic poetry, as it was sung during the morning service (Orthros) of the cathedrals.

A similar eight-mode system was established in Western Europe during the Carolingian reform, and particularly at the Second Council of Nicaea in 787 AD. Quite possibly this was an attempt to follow the example of the Eastern Church.

The evidence for this is an abbreviated chant book called a "tonary", which is a list of incipits of chants ordered according to the intonation formula of each tone in its psalmody. Later on, fully notated and theoretical tonaries were also written. The Byzantine book Octoechos  (9th century) was one of the first hymn books with musical notation and its earliest surviving copies date from the 10th century.

Origins
Students of Orthodox chant today often study the history of Byzantine chant in three periods, identified by the names John of Damascus (675/676-749) as the "beginning", John Koukouzeles (c. 1280–1360) as the "flower" (Papadic Octoechos), and Chrysanthos of Madytos (c. 1770-c. 1840) as the master of the living tradition today (Neobyzantine Octoechos). The latter has the reputation that he once connected in his time the current tradition with the past of Byzantine chant, which was in fact the work of at least four generations of teachers at the New Music School of the Patriarchate.

This division of the history into three periods begins quite late with the 8th century, despite the fact that the octoechos reform was already accepted some decades earlier, before John and Cosmas entered the monastery Mar Saba in Palestine. The earliest sources which gave evidence of the octoechos' use in Byzantine chant, can be dated back to the 6th century.

Jerusalem, Alexandria, or Constantinople
The common schedule and the focus on the circle around John of Damascus is confirmed by a ninth-century treatise called "Hagiopolites" (from hagios polis, "Holy City", referring to Jerusalem) which only survived in a complete form as a late copy. The Hagiopolites treatise served presumably as an introduction of a book called tropologion – a 9th-century chant book which had been replaced soon by the book octoechos, as part of the sticherarion one of the first chant books fully provided with musical notation. The Hagiopolitan emphasis on John of Damascus was obviously the late result of a 9th-century redaction around the Second Council of Nicaea in 787, so it was part of the later Studites reform between Jerusalem and Constantinople and it was motivated theologically, not only because of his contributions to the tropologion, but also because of the keyrole which John of Damascus' polemic against the iconoclasts had during this council.

Nevertheless, the theological and liturgical concept of an eight-week cycle can be traced back to the cathedral rite of Jerusalem during the 5th century, and originally it was the Christian justification of Sunday as the eighth day after Sabbat. Peter Jeffery assumed a first phase during which the concept existed independently in various places, and a second phase during which Palestine became the leading centre of a monastic hymn reform. It established reform models which were also used later by the generation of John of Damascus. Despite that the first paragraph of the "Hagiopolites" ascribes the treatise to John of Damascus, it was probably written about 100 years after his death and went through several redactions during the following centuries.

There is no doubt that the octoechos reform itself had already taken place by 692, because certain passages of the Hagiopolites paraphrase certain law texts (the canons of the synodal decree). Eric Werner assumed that the eight-mode system developed in Jerusalem since the late fifth century and that the reform by the hymnographers of Mar Saba were already a synthesis with the Ancient Greek names used for the tropes, applied to a model of Syrian origin already used in the Byzantine tradition of Jerusalem. During the eighth century, long before Ancient Greek treatises were translated into Arabic and Persian dialects between the ninth and the tenth centuries, there was already a great interest among theorists like Abū Yūsuf al-Kindī, whose Arabic terms were obviously translated from the Greek. He adored the universality of the Greek octoechos:

Sämtliche Stile aller Völker aber haben Teil an den acht byzantinischen Modi (hiya min al-alhān at-tamāniya ar-rūmīya), die wir erwähnt haben, denn es gibt nichts unter allem, was man hören kann, das nicht zu einem von ihnen gehörte, sei es die Stimme eines Menschen oder eines anderen Lebewesens, wie das Wiehern eines Pferdes oder das Schreien eines Esels oder das Krähen des Hahns. Alles, was an Formen des Schreis einem jeden Lebewesen/Tier eigen ist, ist danach bekannt, zu welchem Modus der acht es gehört, und es ist nicht möglich, daß es sich außerhalb eines von ihnen [bewegt].

Every style of any tribe takes part of the Byzantine eight tones (hiya min al-alhān at-tamāniya ar-rūmīya) which I mentioned here. Everything which can be heard, be it the human or be it the animal voice – like the neighing of a horse, the braying of a donkey, or the carking of a cock, can be classified according to one of the eight modes, and it is impossible to find anything outside of the eight mode system.

Al-Kindi demonstrated the intervals on the keyboard of a simple four-stringed oud, starting from the third string as well seven steps in ascending as in descending direction.

According to Eckhard Neubauer, there is another Persian system of seven advār ("cycles"), outside the Arabic reception of the Byzantine octoechos, which was possibly a cultural transfer from Sanskrit treatises. Persian and Ancient Greek sources had been the main reference for the transfer of knowledge in Arabian-Islamic science.

Monastic reform of Mar Saba
According to the Hagiopolites the eight echoi ("modes") were divided in four "kyrioi" (authentic) echoi and their four respective plagioi (enriched, developed) echoi, which were all in the diatonic genus.

8 diatonic echoi of the Hagiopolitan Octoechos 
Despite the late copies of the Greek Hagiopolites treatise, the earliest Latin description of the Greek system of eight echoi is an eleventh-century treatise compilation called "alia musica". "Echos" was translated as "sonus" by the anonymous compilator, who commented with a comparison of the Byzantine octoechos:

Quorum videlicet troporum, sive etiam sonorum, primus graeca lingua dicitur Protus; secundus Deuterus; tertius Tritus; quartus Tetrardus: qui singuli a suis finalibus deorsum pentachordo, quod est diapente, differunt. Superius vero tetrachordum, quod est diatessaron, requirunt, ut unusquisque suam speciem diapason teneat, per quam evagando, sursum ac deorsum libere currat. Cui scilicet diapason plerumque exterius additur, qui emmelis, id est, aptus melo vocatur.

Sciendum quoque, quod Dorius maxime proto regitur, similiter Phrygius deutero, Lydius trito, mixolydius tetrardo. Quos sonos in quibusdam cantilenis suae plagae quodammodo tangendo libant, ut plaga proti tangat protum, deuteri deuterum, triti tritum, tetrardi tetrardum. Et id fas est experiri in gradalibus antiphonis.
It is known about the tropes, as to say: the ἦχοι, that the Greek language call the First πρῶτος, the Second δεύτερος, the Third τρίτος, the Fourth τέταρτος. And above [the pentachord] they require a tetrachord, that is: a fourth (gr. diatessaron), so that each of them has its octave species, in which it can move freely, rambling down and up. For the full octave (gr. diapason) another tone might be added, which is called ὁ ἐμμελής: "according to the melos".
It has to be known that the "Dorian" [octave species] is usually ruling in the πρῶτος, as the "Phrygian" in the δεύτερος, the "Lydian" in the τρίτος, or the "Mixolydian" in the τέταρτος. Their πλάγιοι are derived by these ἦχοι in that way, that the formula touch them [going down a fifth]. So the πλάγιος τοῦ πρώτου touch the πρῶτος, the plagal Second [τοῦ δευτέρου] the δεύτερος, the plagal Third [βαρύς] the τρίτος, the plagal Fourth [πλάγιος τοῦ τετάρτου] the τέταρτος. And this should be proved by the melodies of the antiphonal graduals as a divine law.

While the  had the finalis (final, and usually also base note) on the top, the  had the finalis on bottom of the pentachord.

The later dialogue treatises (Gr. ἐρωταποκρίσεις) refer to the Hagiopolitan diatonic eight modes, when they use the  intonations to find those of the :

Περὶ πλαγίων

Ἀπο τοῦ πλαγίου πρώτου ἤχου πάλιν καταβαίνεις τέσσαρας φωνάς, καὶ εὑρίσκεται πάλιν πλάγιος πρώτου· ὅυτως δὲ /
ἄνανε ἄνες ἀνὲ ἄνες·

Ὁμοίως καὶ ὁ β' ἤχος καταβαίνων φωνάς δ', εὑρίσκεις τὸν πλάγιον αὐτοῦ, ἤγουν τὸν πλάγιον τοῦ δευτέρου.
πλ Β οὕτως δέ.

Ὁμοίως πάλιν ὁ τρίτος καταβαίνεις φωνὰς τέσσαρας, καὶ εὑρίσκεται ὁ πλάγιος αὐτοῦ, ἤγουν ὁ βαρύς, οὕτως·

Ὁμοίως καὶ ἀπὸ τὸν τέταρτον καταβαίνων φωνὰς τέσσαρας, εὑρίσκεις τὸν πλάγιον αὐτοῦ, ὡς ἐστὶ ὁ πλ δ'οὕτως·

Phthorai and mesoi of the Hagia Sophia 
The Hagiopolites as "earliest" theoretical treatise said, that two additional phthorai ("destroyers") were like proper modes which did not fit into the diatonic octoechos system, so the Hagiopolitan octoechos was in fact a system of 10 modes. But the chronology of definitions concerned about two phthorai regarded them first as modes of their own because of their proper melos and that their models had to be sung during the eight-week cycle. It seems that the construction of the eight diatonic echoi was established later by the generation of Theodore the Studite and his brother Joseph.

Nevertheless, the terminology of the Hagiopolites somehow suggested that nenano and nana as  "destroy" one or two diatonic degrees used within one tetarchord of a certain echos, so that the chromatic and enharmonic genera were somehow subordinated and excluded from the diatonic octoechos. This raises the question, when the music in the near eastern Middle Ages became entirely diatonic, since certain melodies were coloured by the other enharmonic and chromatic gene according to the school of Damascus. This is the question about the difference between the Hagiopolitan reform of 692 and in as much it was opposed to the Constantinopolitan tradition and its own modal system.

The author of the Hagiopolites mentioned an alternative system of 16 echoi "sung in the Asma," with 4 phthorai and 4 mesoi beyond the kyrioi and plagioi of the diatonic Octoechos:

Οἱ μὲν οὖν τέσσαρρεις πρῶτοι οὐκ ἐξ ἄλλων τινων ἀλλ'ἐξ αὐτῶν γινονται. οἱ δὲ τέσσαρεις δεύτεροι, ἤγουν οἱ πλάγιοι, ὁ μὲν πλάγιος πρῶτος ἐκ τῆς ὑπορροῆς τοῦ πρώτου γέγονε. καὶ ἀπὸ τῆς ὑπορροῆς τοῦ πληρώματος τοῦ δευτέρου γέγονεν ὁ πλάγιος δευτέρου· ὡς ἐπὶ τὸ πλεῖστον δὲ καὶ τὰ πληρώματα τοῦ δευτέρου [εἰς τὸν πλάγιον δευτέρου] τελειοῖ. ὁ βαρὺς ὁμοίως καὶ ἀπὸ τοῦ τρίτοῦ· καὶ γὰρ εἰς τὸ ἆσμα ἡ ὑποβολὴ τοῦ βαρέως τρίτος ψάλλεται ἅμα τοῦ τέλους αὐτοῦ. καὶ ἀπὸ τοῦ τετάρτου γέγονεν ὁ πλάγιος τέταρτος. καὶ ἀπὸ τῶν τεσσάρων πλαγίων ἐγεννήθησαν τέσσαρεις μέσοι· καὶ ἀπ'αὐτῶν αἱ τέσσαρες φθοραί. καί ἀνεβιβάσθησαν ἦχοι ις', οἵτινες ψάλλονται εἰς τὸ ἆσμα, οἱ δὲ δέκα ὡς προείπομεν εἰς τὸν Ἁγιοπολίτην.

The 4 Echoi which come first are generated from themselves, not from others. As to the four which come next, i.e. the Plagal ones, Plagios Prōtos is derived from Prōtos, and Plagios Deuteros from Deuteros – normally Deuteros melodies end in Plagios Deuteros. Similarly, Barys from Tritos – "for in the Asma Hypobole of Barys is sung as Tritos together with its ending". From the 4 Plagioi originate the 4 Mesoi, and from these the 4 Phthorai. This makes up the 16 Echoi which are sung in the Asma – as already mentioned, there are sung only 10 in the Hagiopolites.

These "echoi of the Asma" did probably point at the rite at the Patriarchal church or even at the cathedral rite of Constantinople which was also known as "choral" or "sung rite" (ἀκολουθία ᾀσματική). The Constantinopolitan chant books were called asmatikon ("book of the choir"), psaltikon ("book of the soloist called 'monophonaris'"), and kontakarion (the name of the psaltikon, if it included the huge collection of kontakia, sung during the morning service).

Unfortunately no early Constantinopolitan chant manual survived, there is only this short paragraph of the Hagiopolites which says, that the singers of the choir followed in their chant books an own modal system, which was distinct from the Hagiopolitan octoechos. A distinction from Constantinople is not the only possible explanation, because Jerusalem had also its own local cathedral rite. Since the 14th century at latest, the monastic rite was not opposed to the cathedral rite, even monks celebrated it on festival occasions, whenever they expected guests.

The earliest sources are those of the Slavic reception of Constantinople which can be dated back not earlier than to the 12th century, and they used a system of 12 modes. The earliest treatises which mention a modal system, is not a chant manual, but a corpus of alchemic treatises, which testifies a modal system of 24 "elements" (στοιχεῖα) or "aims" (στοχοὶ):

Ὥσπερ δὲ τεσσάρων ὄντων μουσικῶν γενικωτάτων στοχῶν, Α Β Γ Δ, γίνονται παρ῾ αὐτῶν τῷ εἴδει διάφοροι στοχοὶ κδ´, κέντροι καὶ ἶσοι καὶ πλάγιοι, καθαροί τε καὶ ἄηχοι <καὶ παράηχοι> · καὶ ἀδύνατον ἄλλως ὑφανθῆναι τὰς κατὰ μέρος ἀπείρους μελῳδίας τῶν ὕμνων ἣ θεραπειῶν, ἤ ἄποκαλύψεων, ἤ ἄλλου σκέλους τῆς ἱερᾶς ἐπιστήμης, καὶ οἷον ῥεύσεως ἤ φθορᾶς ἤ ἄλλων μουσικῶν παθῶν ἐλευθέρας,

As there are 4 basic elements/targets [earth, water, air, and fire] which created their music, the πρῶτος, the δεύτερος, the τρίτος, and the τέταρτος, and by their formulas the same generate 24 different elements: the [4] κέντροι (central), [4] ἶσοι (basic), and [4] πλάγιοι (plagal), the [4] καθαροί (kathartic), [4] ἄηχοι (aphonic), and [4] παράηχοι (paraphonic). Hence, it is impossible to create something outside those infinite melodies of hymns, treatments, revelations, and of other parts of the Holy Wisdom, which is free from the irregularities and corruptions of other musical emotions (πάθη).

In the edition of the treatise by Otto Gombosi, the four "elements" (α', β', γ', δ') were associated with certain colours—πρῶτος with black (all colours together), δεύτερος with white (no colour at all), τρίτος with yellow (an elementary coulour), and τέταρτος with purple (a combination of elementary colours). These passages could be easily compiled with Zosimos of Panopolis' treatise about the process of bleaching.

The system favoured 3 four tetrachord sets (either modes by themselves or simply degree of the modes with different functions), called κέντροι, ἷσοι, and πλάγιοι. Kέντρος would be probably an early name for μέσος, if it lied between the ἶσος and πλάγιος, it could be as well used as an early name for κύριος ἦχος, because it is mentioned here first, while ἶσος could mean "equivalent", or just basis notes.

The exact point of reference concerning this 24 mode system was not clarified in the treatise, but it is evident, that there was a canonised wisdom which was connected with an ethical doctrine excluding certain passions (πάθη, pathe) as corruptions. Inside this wisdom, there was a Neoplatonic concept of an ideal and divine existence, which can be found and classified according to a modal scheme based on four elements. The term "element" (στοχείον) was less meant as a technical term or modal category, it was rather an alchemistic interpretation of the 24 musical modes.

In comparison, the Hagiopolitan terminology already included the "corruption" (φθορά) as an acceptable modal category in itself, which was neither excluded in the Hagiopolitan Octoechos nor in the modal system of a certain cathedral rite, which was made of 16 echoi. On the other hand, the described system, whether it meant 24 echoi including 12 pathologic echoi, called "aechoi" and "paraechoi", and associated with 4 "katharoi" or just cadential degrees or other modal functions. It is not clear, whether the latter name was simply meant in a geographical or ethnical way or whether it was here connected with a kind of music therapy which included certain pathe as a kind of antidote. Medical treatises of the Mediterranean had been developed later on by the association of melodic modes with 4 elements and 4 humours.

Latin reception 

The introduction of the eight mode system in Western chant traditions was part of the Carolingian reform. Officially, it was motivated by Pope Adrian I's confirmation of an earlier Eastern chant reform during the synode in 787, during which he accepted the reform for the Western traditions as well. Nevertheless, a Carolingian interest for the Byzantine octoechos can already be dated back to a visit some years earlier, when a Byzantine legacy introduced a series of antiphons sung during a procession for Epiphany. These antiphons served as a model for the eight modes according to the Hagiopolitan system.

The contemporary invention of a proper Latin version of the eight mode system was mainly studied from two perspectives:

 the reception of Ancient Greek music theory since Boethius and the synthesis between music theory as a science and a liberal art of the mathematic Quadrivium on the one hand, and as a medium of chant transmission on the other hand. The eight church tones were called after the names of octave species, which were not connected with modal patterns and plainchant theory in earlier times.
 the simplification of chant transmission by a Western manuscript type called tonary which allowed the transfer of a huge chant repertoire like the Roman one, but also its deductive modal classification which changed the oral transmission of chant entirely.

Synthesis in Latin music theory 
Latin theorists who knew the Hellenic tropes only through Boethius' 6th-century translation of Ptolemy (De institutione musica), made the synthesis of the Ancient Greek music theory with the Octoechos as a system of eight church tones, identified with the tropes. The synthesis had not been done earlier than during the Carolingian reform (usually dated according to Charlemagne's admonitio generalis which was decreed in 789), before music theory as science was strictly separated from chant transmission and the cantor as a profession dedicated to church music.

The terms tropus (transposition octave) and modus (the octave genre defined by the position of the tonus, the whole tone with the proportion of 9:8, and the semitonium, the half tone with the proportion of 256:243) were taken from Boethius' translation. But the Antique names of the seven modi were applied to the eight church tones called toni. The first attempt to connect Ancient Greek music theory (as expressed in  Boethius) and the theory of plainchant can be found in the treatise De harmonica institutione by Hucbald of Saint-Amand Abbey, written by the end of the 9th century, in which the author addressed his treatise explicitly to cantors and not to mathematicians, whereas the reduction of 4 "finales" which made up the tetrachord D—E—F—G, was already done in Carolingian times in the treatises Musica and Scolica enchiriadis. Musica enchiriadis is also the only Latin treatise which testifies to the presence of a tetraphonic tone system, represented by 4 Dasia-signs and therefore called "Dasia system", and even the practical use of transposition (metabolē kata tonon) in plainchant, called "absonia". Its name probably derived from "sonus", the Latin term for ἦχος, but in the context of this treatise the use of absonia is reserved to describe a primitive form of polyphony or heterophony, rather than serving as a precise description of transposition in monodic chant, as it was used in certain genres of Byzantine chant.

Hucbald used an idiosyncratic Greek letter system which referred to the double octave system (systēma teleion) and called the four elements known as "finales" according to the Greek system:

Lycanos ypaton scilicet autentum protum· & plagis eiusdem· id est primum & secundum; Hypate mesonʕ autentum deuterum· & plagis eiusʕ iii & iiii· Parypate mesonʕ autentum tritum & plagis eiusʕ id est v· & vi. Lycanos mesonʕ autentum tetrardum. & plagis eiusʕ id est vii· & viii. Ita ut ad aliquam ipsarum ·quatuor. quamvis ul[tra] citraque variabiliter circumacta necessario omnis quaecumque fuerit redigatur· cantilena· Unde et e[a]edem finales appellatae quod finem in ipsis cuncta quae canuntur accipiant.

Λιχανὸς ὑπάτων [D] is [the φθόγγος of] the autentus protus and its plagal which are [tonus] I and II, ὑπάτη μέσων [E] of the autentus deuterus and its plagal which are [tonus] III and IV, παρυπάτη μέσων [F] of the autentus tritus and its plagal which are [tonus] V and VI, λιχανὸς μέσων [G] of the autentus tetrardus and its plagal which are [tonus] VII and VIII, for the reason, that these four very present ones surround necessarily each melody, so that they, however they might be, can be reduced to them. These four [φθόγγοι] are called 'finales', since in all those [melodies] which are sung, they are perceived as their end.

According to the Latin synthesis the plagal and authentic tones of protus, deuterus, tritus, and tetrardus did not use the same ambitus as in the Hagiopolitan Octoechos, but authentic and plagal tones used both the finalis of the plagios, so that the finalis of the kyrios, the fifth degree of the mode, was no longer used as finalis, but as "repercussa": the recitation tone used in a simple form of psalmody which was another genuine invention by the Carolingian reformers. The ambitus of the authentic tones was made up the same way as used in the Greek Octoechos, while the plagal tones used a lower ambitus: not the tetrachord above the pentachord, but below it. Hence, the hypodorian octave referred the "tonus secundus" and was constructed A—D—a, and the dorian as "tonus primus" D—a—d, both tones of the protus used D as finalis, the hypophrygian octave was B—E—b and was the ambitus of the "tonus quartus", and the phrygian octave E—b—e was related to the "tonus tertius" and its finalis E belonged to the deuterus, the hypolydian octave C—F—c was connected with the "tonus sixtus", the lydian octave F—c—f with the "tonus quintus" and both shared the finalis F called "tritus", the last was the seventh octave G—d—g called "mixolydian" which referred to the "tonus septimus" and its finalis G.

Tonary 

The earliest chant theory connected with the Carolingian octoechos was related to the book tonary. It played a key role in memorising chant and the earliest tonaries referred to the Greek names as elements of a tetrachord: πρῶτος, δεύτερος, τρίτος, and τέταρτος. They were translated into Latin as "protus", "deuterus", "tritus", and "tetrardus", but only the tetrachord D—E—F—G was supposed to contain the final notes ("finales") for the eight tones used in the Latin octoechos. Since the 10th century the eight tones were applied to eight simplified models of psalmody, which soon adopted in their terminations the melodic beginnings of the antiphons, which were sung as refrains during psalm recitation. This practice made the transitions smoother, and in the list of the antiphons which can be found since the earliest tonaries, it was enough to refer to the melodic beginnings or incipits of the text. In the earliest tonaries no models of psalmody had been given and incipits from all chant genres were listed, probably just for a modal classification (see the section for the "Autentus protus" of the Saint Riquier tonary).

According to Michel Huglo, there was a prototype tonary which initiated the Carolingian reform. But in a later study he mentioned an even earlier tonary which was brought as a present by a Byzantine legacy which celebrated procession antiphons for Epiphany in a Latin translation.

Already during the 10th century tonaries became so widespread in different regions, that they do not only allow to study the difference between local schools according to its modal classification, its redaction of modal patterns, and its own way of using Carolingian psalmody. They also showed a fundamental difference between the written transmission of Latin and Greek chant traditions, as it had developed between the 10th and 12th centuries. The main concern of Latin cantors and their tonaries was a precise and unambiguous classification of whatever melody type according to the local perception of the Octoechos system.

Greek psaltes were not interested at all in this question. They knew the models of each modes by certain simple chant genres as the troparion and the heirmoi (the melodic models used to create poetry in the meter of the heirmologic odes), but other genres like sticheron and kontakion could change the echos within their melos, so their main interest was the relationship between the echoi to compose elegant and discrete changes between them.

In contrary, the very particular form and function of the tonary within chant transmission made it evident, that the modal classification of Latin cantors according to the eight tones of the Octoechos had to be done a posteriori, deduced by the modal analysis of the chant and its melodic patterns, while the transmission of the traditional chant itself did not provide any model except of the psalm tones used for the recitation of the psalms and the canticles.

The tonary was the very heart of the mainly oral chant transmission used during the Carolingian reform and as its medium it must have had a strong impact on the melodic memory of the cantors who used it in order to memorize the Roman chant, after a synode confirmed Charlemagne's admonitio generalis. The written transmission by fully notated chant manuscripts, the object of chant studies today, cannot be dated back to an earlier time than nearly 200 years after the admonitio—the last third of the 10th century. And it seems that Roman cantors whose tradition had to be learnt, followed at least 100 years later by the transcription of their chant repertory and no document has survived which can testify the use of tonaries among Roman cantors. Pope Adrian I's confirmation of the Eastern octoechos reform had probably no consequences on the tradition of Roman chant, which might be an explanation for the distinct written transmission, as it can be studied between Roman Frankish and Old Roman chant manuscripts.

The eight sections of the Latin tonary are usually ordered "Tonus primus Autentus Protus", "Tonus secundus Plagi Proti", "Tonus tertius Autentus deuterus" etc. Each section is opened by an intonation formula using the names like "Noannoeane" for the authentic and "Noeagis" for the plagal tones. In his theoretical tonary "Musica disciplina" Aurelian of Réôme asked a Greek about the meaning of the syllables, and reported that they had no meaning, they were rather an expression of joy as used by peasants to communicate with their working animals like horses. There was usually no exact resemblance of the Latin syllables to the names of the Greek intonations or enechemata which were identified with the diatonic kyrioi and plagioi echoi, but Aurelian's question made it obvious that the practice was taken from Greek singers. Unlike the Hagiopolitan octoechos, which used two additional phthorai with the syllables Nana and Nenano for changes into the enharmonic and chromatic genus, the enharmonic and chromatic genus was excluded from the Latin octoechos, at least according to Carolingian theorists.

Since the 10th century tonaries also include the mnemic verses of certain model antiphons which memorise each tone by one verse. The most common among all tonaries was also used by Guido of Arezzo in his treatise Micrologus: "Primum querite regnum dei", "Secundum autem simile est huic" etc. Another characteristic was that melodic melisms called neumae followed the intonation formulas or mnemic verses. Usually they differed more among different tonaries than the preceding intonations or verses, but they all demonstrated the generative and creative aspect within chant transmission.

In comparison with Byzantine psaltes who always used notation in a more or less stenographic way, the exact patterns used during the so-called "thesis of the melos" belonged to the oral tradition of a local school, its own modal system and its genre. But already the question of chant genre was connected with local traditions in medieval times and the point of reference for the psaltes who performed a certain genre: the Hagiopolitan octoechos and its genres (the odes according to the models of the heirmologion, the troparia of the octoechos or tropologion), or the Constantinopolitan cathedral rite (akolouthia asmatike) and its books asmatikon, psaltikon, and kontakarion might serve here as examples.

Question of intervals and their transposition
The exact proportions which divided a tetrachord, had never been a subject of Greek medieval treatises concerned about Byzantine chant. The separation between the mathematical science harmonikai and chant theory gave space to various speculations, even to the assumption that the same division was used as described in Latin music theory, operating with two diatonic intervals like tonus (9:8) and semitonium (256:243).  Nevertheless, some treatises referred the tetrachord division into three intervals called the "great tone" (μείζων τόνος) which often corresponded to the prominent position of the whole tone (9:8), the "middle tone" (ἐλάσσων τόνος) between α and β, and the "small tone" (ἐλάχιστος τόνος) between β and γ which was usually a much larger interval than the half tone, and this division was common among most divisions by different ancient Greek theorists that were mentioned by Ptolemy in his Harmonics. Before Chrysanthos' Theoretika (the Eisagoge was simply an extract, while the Mega Theoretikon was published by his student Panagiotes Pelopides), exact proportions were never mentioned in Greek chant theory. His system of 68 commata which is based on a corrupted use of arithmetics, can be traced back to the division of 12:11 x 88:81 x 9:8 = 4:3 between α and δ.

Pitches and their tonal system
Although Chrysanthos did not mention his name, the first who mentioned precisely these proportions starting from the open string of the third or middle chord of the oud, was the Arab theorist Al-Farabi in his Kitab al-Musiqa al-Kabir which was written during the first half of the 10th century. His explicit references to Persian and Ancient Greek music theory were possible, because they had been recently translated into Arabic and Persian dialects in the library of Baghdad. Thanks to them Al-Farabi had also an excellent knowledge of Ancient Greek music theory. The method of demonstrating the intervals by the frets of the oud keyboard was probably taken from Al-Kindi. Here the intervals are not referred to the Byzantine phthongoi, but to the name of the frets. And the fret corresponding to β was called "ring finger fret of Zalzal" (wuṣtā Zalzal), named after the famous Baghdadi oud player Zalzal. It seems that the proportion of the Zalzal fret was a refined one in Bagdad using a large middle tone that came very close to the interval of the small tone, while the Mawsili school used 13:12 instead of 12:11. There is no indication that this division had been of Byzantine origin, so Western scholars felt seduced to ascribe the use of the division called "soft diatonic" (diatonikos malakos) and the chromaticism derived from it as an influence of the Ottoman Empire and to regard their view of the systema teleion also as a norm for the Byzantine tonal system. As Phanariotes (Phanar was the Greek district of Istanbul with the residence of the Patriarchate) who composed as well in the makamlar, the teachers of the New Music School of the Patriarchate around Chrysanthos had certainly exchanges with Sephardic, Armenian, and Sufi musicians, but an intensive exchange between Byzantine, Arab and Persian musicians had already a history of more than 1000 years.

Unlike Latin treatises only a few Greek treatises of chant have survived and their authors wrote nothing about the intervals, about microtonal shifts as part of a certain melos and its echos, or about the practice of ison singing (isokratema). Nevertheless, these practices remained undisputed, because they are still part of the living tradition today, while Western plainchant became rediscovered during the 19th century. Neither musicians nor musicologists were longer familiar with them which explains why various descriptions, as they can be found in certain Latin treatises, were ignored for quite a long time.

Ancient Greek music theory had always been a point of reference in Latin chant treatises, something similar cannot be found in Greek chant treatises before the 14th century, but there were a few Latin treatises of the 11th century which did not only refer to Ancient music theory and the systema teleion together with the Greek names of its elements, they even had parts dedicated to Byzantine chant. The appreciation for Byzantine chant is surprising, because there were very few authors except Boethius who had really studied Greek treatises and who were also capable to translate them.

The systema teleion was present by the Boethian diagram which represented it for the diatonic, the chromatic, and the enharmonic genus. Several tonaries used letters which referred to the positions of this diagram. The most famous example is the letter notation of William of Volpiano which he developed for the Cluniac reforms by the end of the 10th century. In his school a unique tonary was already written, when he was reforming abbot of St. Benignus of Dijon. The tonary shows the Roman-Frankish mass chant written out in neume and pitch notation. The repertory is classified according to the Carolingian tonary and its entirely diatonic octoechos. The use of tyronic letters clearly shows, that the enharmonic diesis was used as a kind of melodic attraction within the diatonic genus, which sharpened the semitonium. Even in Guido of Arezzo's treatise Micrologus, at least in earlier copies, there is still a passage which explains, how the diesis can be found on the monochord. It sharpens the semitonium by replacing the usual whole tone (9:8) between re—mi (D—E, G—a, or a—b) by an even larger one in the proportion of 7:6 which was usually perceived as an attraction towards fa.

But there were as well other practices which could not be explained by the Boethian diagram and its use of tonus and semitonium. The authors of one theoretical tonary of the compilation called alia musica used an alternative intonation with the name AIANEOEANE, the name was obviously taken from a Byzantine enechema ἅγια νεανὲς, a kind of Mesos  with the finalis and basis on a low E, and applied the Byzantine practice to certain pieces of Roman-Frankish chant which were classified as "tonus tertius" or "Autentus deuterus".

Medieval use of transposition (μεταβολή κατὰ τόνον)
Latin cantors knew about the theoretical concept of the practice of transposition since Boethius' translation of Ptolemy. Very few can be said, if they ever understood the practical use of it. Nevertheless, there was a rudimentary knowledge which can be found in the Carolingian treatises Musica and Scolica enchiriadis. The Musica enchiriadis was also the only Latin treatise which documented a second tone system beside the systema teleion, but it does not explain at all, how these both systems worked together in practice.

The Hagiopolites did neither explain it nor did it mention any tone system nor the metabole kata tonon, but this was probably, because the hymn reform of Jerusalem was mainly concerned with simple models exemplified by heirmoi or troparia. Greek protopsaltes used the transposition only in very few compositions of the sticherarion, for instance the compositions passing through all the modes of the Octoechos, or certain melismatic elaborations of troparia in the psaltic style, the soloistic style of the Constantinopolitan cathedral rite. This might explain that Charles Atkinson discussed Carolingian theory in comparison with the later papadikai, in which all possible transpositions were represented by the Koukouzelian wheel or by the kanônion.

Wheels are also used in Arabic music theory since the 13th century, and Al-Farabi was the first who started a long tradition of science, which did not only find the proportions of the untransposed diatonic system on the oud keyboard, but also those of all possible transpositions. The use of instruments had to adapt to a very complex tradition which had probably been a rather vocal tradition in its origins.

See also 
Papadic and Neobyzantine Octoechos
Musical system of ancient Greece
Byzantine Music—traditional music of the Byzantine Empire
Protopsaltes (Domestikos, Lampadarios)—ranks of psaltes in charge of the Patriarchate

People 
Andrew of Crete—teacher of John of Damascus, and Cosmas of Maiuma and hymn reformer at Mar Saba (8th century)
Joseph the Hymnographer—Sicilian Greek and hymn reformer at the Monastery of Stoudios (9th century)

Notes

Sources

Greek chant treatises 
; quoted and translated into German: 
, see the edition: .
.
.

Latin treatises and tonaries (6t–12th century)
.
 Edition: 
 Edition: 
 Edition 1:  Edition 2: 
 
 
.
 Edition: .
 Edition:

Chant books with octoechos notation

Palaeo-Byzantine notation (10th–13th century)

Latin chant books and notated tonaries 

 Edition:

Studies 

.
.

.

.
.
  

.
.

 
 

.

.
 

.

 
.

External links
 

Ibn al-Munadjdjim (French)

Ancient Greek music theory
Classical and art music traditions
Byzantine music theory
 
Eastern Orthodox liturgical music
Modes (music)
Tonaries
History of science